Athens Township may refer to:

Places 
Canada
 Athens Township, Ontario

United States
 Athens Township, Ringgold County, Iowa
 Athens Township, Jewell County, Kansas
 Athens Township, Michigan
 Athens Township, Minnesota
 Athens Township, Athens County, Ohio
 Athens Township, Harrison County, Ohio
 Athens Township, Bradford County, Pennsylvania
 Athens Township, Crawford County, Pennsylvania

Township name disambiguation pages